is a Japanese footballer currently playing as a defender for FC Gifu, on loan from Matsumoto Yamaga.

Career statistics

Club

Notes

References

External links

1997 births
Living people
Japanese footballers
Association football defenders
J3 League players
Matsumoto Yamaga FC players
FC Gifu players